Prince Ataúlfo of Orléans (20 October 1913 – 8 October 1974), was a Spanish prince, the youngest son of Infante Alfonso, Duke of Galliera and Princess Beatrice of the United Kingdom. He was President of Real Club de la Puerta de Hierro from 1962 to 1966.

Life and family
He was born in Madrid, as the third and last son of Infante Alfonso, Duke of Galliera (elder son of Infante Antonio, Duke of Galliera, and of Infanta Eulalia of Spain) and Princess Beatrice of Saxe-Coburg and Gotha (youngest daughter of Alfred, Duke of Saxe-Coburg and Gotha, and of Grand Duchess Maria Alexandrovna of Russia). He was named after king Athaulf, who ruled the Visigothic Kingdom from 410 to 415.

Although he was not made an Infante like his eldest brother, Alfonso XIII gave him and his other brother Alonso the same privileges and honours. His godparents were Infante Carlos of the Two-Sicilies, and Isabella de Borbón. Prince Ataúlfo was a student at Sandroyd School in Wiltshire.

He was idolised by Priscilla Scott-Ellis who was not deterred by his mother who hinted that he was not interested. He would later reveal his homosexuality.

When the Spanish Civil War broke out, Prince Ataúlfo volunteered in the Condor Legion, the German volunteer unit that was sent by Hitler to repel Communism in Spain. Only he and two of his cousins, Luis Alfonso and José Eugenio of Bavaria (Prince Fernando of Bavaria's sons) represented the Spanish royal family in Francoist official acts, due to the pro-democratic views held by most of the royal family. He was followed to Spain by Priscilla Scott-Ellis who volunteered as a nurse mainly to be near him. In time she married another Spanish aristocrat.

He died in Málaga the 8th of October 1974 as a result of a pancreatitis.

Honours

 : Knight Grand Cross of the Order of Charles III (1930)

Ancestry

References

1913 births
1974 deaths
People educated at Sandroyd School
House of Orléans-Galliera
House of Orléans